Parkes Airport  is an airport located  northeast of Parkes, New South Wales, Australia. Approximately 32,000 passengers used scheduled service at the airport in 2011. The Parkes Shire Council currently maintains the airport.

Airlines and destinations

Statistics

See also
List of airports in New South Wales

References

External links
Parkes Airport

Airports in New South Wales
Parkes Shire